Highway 357 (AR 357, Ark. 357, and Hwy. 357) is a north–south state highway in St. Francis County, Arkansas. The route of  runs from Highway 50 north to U.S. Route 70 (US 70). The route is maintained by the Arkansas State Highway and Transportation Department (AHTD).

Route description
Highway 357 begins at Highway 50 near Greasy Corner and runs north through many unincorporated communities. The route passes through Davis, Stump City, Jonquil and Willow Bend. Further north the route intersects US 70 and terminates. US 70 is essentially a frontage road to Interstate 40 in this area.

History
The route was designated by the Arkansas State Highway Commission on July 10, 1957, during a period of expansion in the state highway system. The Arkansas General Assembly passed the Act 148 of 1957, the Milum Road Act, creating  of new state highways in each county.

Major intersections

See also

References

External links

357
Transportation in St. Francis County, Arkansas